Gabriela Bitolo (born 1 April 1999) is a Brazilian handballer for EC Pinheiros and the Brazilian national team.

Achievements
2016 Pan American Women's Youth Handball Championship: All star team right back

References

1999 births
Living people
Brazilian female handball players
Handball players at the 2020 Summer Olympics
21st-century Brazilian women